David Stynes (born 1976) is a former Gaelic footballer and Australian rules footballer.

Playing career

Australian rules football
Stynes played for Ireland's winning team in the 2002 Australian Football International Cup in Melbourne. He was also selected for the All-Star Team, and returned with the team that reached the semi finals of the 2005 Australian Football International Cup. He won his second medal when Ireland won the 2011 Australian Football International Cup title. In 2011 David was appointed captain coach of the Moorabbin Kangaroos in the Southern Football League in Victoria.

Gaelic football
The Ballyboden St Enda's clubman represented Dublin GAA at minor level and won a Leinster Minor Football Championship medal in 1994 before losing to Galway in the All-Ireland semi-final. He also represented Dublin at under-21 & Senior level. In Australia, he represented Victoria in the Australasian GAA Championships.

Family
His brother Brian was a Gaelic footballer who played for the Dublin senior team and won an All-Ireland Senior Football Championship medal in 1995, while his late brother Jim won the Brownlow Medal and played with the Melbourne Football Club.

References

1976 births
Living people
Ballyboden St Enda's Gaelic footballers
Dublin inter-county Gaelic footballers
Gaelic footballers who switched code
Irish expatriate sportspeople in Australia
Irish players of Australian rules football
David